The Dan Johnson Farmstead is a historic farm property on United States Route 2 in Williston, Vermont. It was first developed in 1787 by Dan Johnson, one of Williston's first settlers, and has remained in his family since that time. It was listed on the National Register of Historic Places in 1993.

Description and history
The Dan Johnson Farmstead is located in eastern Williston, with the farm building complex and associated houses located on or near US Route 2 east of Johnson Lane. The southern portion is used mainly for hay production, with the upland portions gradually reverting to forest. The area north of I-89 is used either for cultivation or as pastureland for dairy cattle. The main building complex is on the north side of US 2, and consists of a c. 1840 Greek Revival farmhouse, a series of connected barns and silos, and a toolshed. On the east side of Johnson Lane, near I-89, stands a c. 1898 farmhouse with Queen Anne features, and a third farmhouse, originally built to house tenant workers, stands at the eastern end of the farm fields on the south side of US 2.

The farm property was settled in 1787 by Dan Johnson, who was, along with members of the state's prominent Chittenden family, one of Williston's first proprietors.  The Greek Revival farmhouse was probably built by Johnson's son Nathan, as were some of the surviving barns.  Nathan and later his son John expanded the dairy aspect of the farm operation.  The property was expanded in the 1920s by the acquisition of the Darling farm to the south, which included the c. 1898 farmhouse on Johnson Lane.  I-89 was built through the property beginning in the late 1950s, complicating farm operations, since cattle could readily be driven to the southern tract.  As of the farm's listing on the National Register in 1993, it was still owned by Johnson descendants.

See also
National Register of Historic Places listings in Chittenden County, Vermont

References

Farms on the National Register of Historic Places in Vermont
Historic districts on the National Register of Historic Places in Vermont
National Register of Historic Places in Chittenden County, Vermont
Queen Anne architecture in Vermont
Residential buildings completed in 1787
Buildings and structures in Williston, Vermont